Qasr-e Asem (also Romanized as Qaşr-e ‘Āşem; also known as Ghasr Asem and Kūshk-e Qāsem) is a village in Khvajehei Rural District, Meymand District, Firuzabad County, Fars Province, Iran. At the 2006 census, its population was 183, in 51 families.

References 

Populated places in Firuzabad County